Narapati Sithu (also Narapatisithu, Sithu II or Cansu II; 1138–1211) was king of Pagan dynasty of Burma (Myanmar) from 1174 to 1211. He is considered the last important king of Pagan. His peaceful and prosperous reign gave rise to Burmese culture which finally emerged from the shadows of Mon and Pyu cultures. The Burman leadership of the kingdom was now unquestioned. The Pagan Empire reached its peak during his reign, and would decline gradually after his death.

The reign saw many firsts in Burmese history. For the first time, the term Mranma (the Burmans) was openly used in Burmese language inscriptions. Burmese became the primary written language of the kingdom, replacing Mon and Pyu. The first Burmese customary law based on his grandfather Alaungsithu's judgments was compiled, and used as the common system of law for the entire kingdom. He founded the Royal Palace Guards, which later evolved to become the nucleus of the Burmese army in war time.

He encouraged further reforms of the Burmese Buddhism. By the efforts of his primate Shin Uttarajiva, the majority of the Burmese Buddhist monks realigned themselves with the Mahavihara school of Sri Lanka.

Early life
The future king was born to Prince Narathu and his wife (later known as Myauk Pyinthe, "Queen of the Northern Palace") in Pagan (Bagan) on 8 October 1150. The chronicles do not agree on his birth and reign dates. The table below lists the dates given by the four main chronicles.

Note that all the chronicles say he was born on a Tuesday but the king's date of birth by scholarship fell on Sunday.

Heir apparent
In 1171, his elder brother Naratheinkha succeeded the throne, the new king was greeted with multiple rebellions by the Kudus in the Tagaung region in the north and the Mons of Tenasserim coast in the south. Naratheinkha appointed his younger brother Narapatisithu as the heir apparent and commander-in-chief to deal with the rebellions. In 1174, Naratheinkha seized Narapati's wife Weluwaddy (Veluvati) after he sent Narapati on a mission. Narapati retaliated by sending a group of 80 led by Aungzwa to assassinate his brother. After the assassination, he ascended the throne as Sithu II in honor of his grandfather Alaungsithu.

He came to power some time between 27 March 1174 and 10 August 1174, most probably between April or May 1174. He assumed the regnal name "Śrī Tribhuvanāditya Pavaradhammarāja."

Reign
One of the first acts of Sithu II was to found the Royal Palace Guards, whose sole duty was to guard the palace and the king. (The Palace Guards later evolved to become the nucleus round which the Burmese army assembled in war time.) He then had to pacify the kingdom, which had seen much instability since the death of Alaungsithu in 1167, and had grown increasingly restless. He successfully persuaded the great-grandson of the Mon king Manuha not to start a rebellion. The rest of the reign was free of rebellions.

Economy
By all accounts, his reign was peaceful and prosperous. Following Anawratha's footsteps, Narapatisithu worked on increasing Upper Burma's economic and manpower advantages over the Irrawaddy valley. He continued to develop the Kyaukse region by building the Kyaukse weir, and expanded the irrigable areas by starting the Mu canals in the present-day Shwebo District. His attempts to expand irrigation southwards into Minbu District by building a canal system repeatedly failed, and had to be abandoned. Through his efforts, the kingdom grew even more prosperous.

The prosperity of the kingdom is reflected in the superb the Gawdawpalin and Sulamani temples in Pagan he built. The king also built the Minmalaung, Dhammayazika and Chaukpala nearby. His lesser pagodas, such as the Zetawun in Myeik District, the Shwe Indein Pagoda in Nyaungshwe (Shan State) shows the reach of his kingdom.

Rise of Burmese culture
His reign also saw the rise of Burmese culture which finally emerged from the shadows of Mon and Pyu cultures. The Burmans, who had entered the Irrawaddy valley en masse only in the 9th and 10th centuries, had led the Pagan Kingdom under the name of the Pyu. But now, the Burman leadership of the kingdom was now unquestioned. For the first time, the term Mranma (the Burman people) was openly used in Burmese language inscriptions. (The earliest use of Mranma was found in a Mon inscription dedicated to Kyansittha dated 1102.) The Burmese language became the primary written language of the kingdom, replacing Mon and Pyu.

Administration
Narapatisithu appointed Nadaungmya, great-grandson of Nyaung-U Hpi (one of the great Paladins during Anawrahta's reign), chief justice. His chief minister was Ananda Thuriya, reportedly a man of valor who continually hunted down robbers and presented them alive to the king. He had the first Burmese customary law based on his grandfather Alaungsithu's judgments compiled, and used as the common system of law for the entire kingdom.

Religious reforms
He encouraged further reforms of the Burmese Buddhism. By the efforts of his primate Shin Uttarajiva, the majority of the Burmese Buddhist monks realigned themselves with the Mahavihara school of Sri Lanka away from the less orthodox Conjeveram-Thaton school.

Sinhalese raids
According to the Pali Culawamsa Chronicles, the King of Polonnaruwa (Sri Lanka), Parakramabahu I, dispatched an expedition in 1180 to settle a trade dispute. It suffered from storms and several ships were wrecked. But one ship reached the Crow Island near Mawlamyaing and five reached Pathein, killing a governor, burning villages, massacring the inhabitants, and carrying off a number into slavery. As the Burmese chronicles do not mention these events, there is no check on the Sinhalese version.

Nevertheless, the friendly relations were soon resumed. The historical cultural exchanges between the countries continued. The reformation of Burmese Buddhism through the Sinhalese Mahavihara school continued.

Death
Sithu II died at age 73 (in his 74th year) on 18 August 1211 (11th waxing of Tawthalin 573 ME). On his deathbed, he placed the hands of his five sons on his chest and enjoined them to rule with mercy and justice, and to live together in brotherly love.

Notes

References

Bibliography
 
 
 
 
 
 
 
 
 
 
 
 

Pagan dynasty
1138 births
1211 deaths
12th-century Burmese monarchs
13th-century Burmese monarchs